Bobková is a surname. Notable people with the surname include:

Miriam Bobková (born 1979), Slovak sprint hurdler
Radka Bobková (born 1973), Czech tennis player
Hana Bobková (1929–2017), Czech gymnast